Donovan "Razor" Ruddock (born December 21, 1963) is a Jamaican-born Canadian former professional boxer who competed from 1982 to 2001 and in 2015. He is known for his two fights against Mike Tyson in 1991, a fight against Lennox Lewis in 1992, and a fight with Tommy Morrison in 1995. Ruddock was also known for his exceptionally heavy punching; one of the best examples of his left hand power was his knockout of former WBA heavyweight champion Michael Dokes in 1990. His favoured weapon at the ring proved to be a highly versatile half-hook, half-uppercut left-handed punch he called "The Smash" which accounted for the majority of his knockout wins -- it also happened to be his major downside throughout his career.  Being a left-handed puncher fighting out of the orthodox stance, he didn't throw a single right hand during most knockout flurries.

Professional career

Early years
Ruddock was born in St. Catherine, Jamaica. At age 11, he left Jamaica with his family and moved to Toronto, settling in the city's Weston neighbourhood. Ruddock attended Emery Collegiate Institute and Westview Centennial Secondary School, when he was a teenager.

As an amateur boxer, Ruddock had a win over Lennox Lewis in March 1980 in Toronto at the Ontario Junior Boxing Championship, winning via a split decision (3:2) in the 75 kg weight class (165 lbs). He turned pro in 1982, but his career started slowly, having only 11 fights between 1982 and 1985.  He won eight of his first nine fights, but drew his fifth. More controversy would follow in April 1985 when he lost to journeyman David Jaco, who would be KO'd by a young Mike Tyson the next year. After eight rounds Ruddock's corner threw in the towel when he complained of breathing problems. Jaco was awarded a TKO victory.  It was discovered Ruddock had a rare respiratory illness and doctors told him his career would be over.

Return to the ring
After taking 10 months off after rehabilitation Ruddock made a full recovery to the doctors' surprise and resumed his boxing career winning 9 straight fights, 8 of them by KO also picking up an impressive decision win over former WBA heavyweight title-holder Mike Weaver before winning the Canadian heavyweight championship by a first-round knockout against Ken Lakusta in 1988.

In 1989, after two more wins by KO, a fight with another former WBA heavyweight title-holder was made, against the hard-hitting James "Bonecrusher" Smith. In the round 2, Ruddock was floored heavily by Smith but showed his heart by getting up, coming back in the round, and impressively knocking out Smith in round 7.

A title bout was made with undisputed heavyweight champion Mike Tyson, scheduled for November 1989 in Edmonton, Alberta.  Tyson, claiming illness, cancelled and opted instead to fight James "Buster" Douglas in Tokyo. Tyson would go on to lose in one of the biggest upsets in boxing history.

Ruddock vs Dokes
In 1990, Ruddock fought former heavyweight champion Michael Dokes. Ruddock went into the fight as underdog but put on one of the best performances of his career knocking out Dokes in the 4th round. Dokes appeared to be seriously stunned on the ropes after taking Ruddock's famous "Smash" left hook. A right hand followed, which appeared to put Dokes out, but Ruddock threw another two hooks to knock Dokes out cold for several minutes.

Difficulty finding opponents
After another KO win over Kimmuel Odum in 1990, Ruddock had difficulty finding a marquee opponent. Ruddock hoped to fight Evander Holyfield (fresh from a KO win over James "Buster" Douglas for the heavyweight championship). Instead, Holyfield opted to fight 42-year-old George Foreman.

Mike Tyson

With no big name opponent, Ruddock took a warm up fight against Mike Rouse in December 1990 winning by 1st round knockout. In January 1991, Mike Tyson accepted Ruddock's challenge and fight was scheduled for March 18. It would pit Tyson, the number #1 contender, against Ruddock who was number #2, for the right to fight the winner of Holyfield-Foreman. Ruddock was dropped in round three but fought back until referee Richard Steele stopped the fight in Tyson's favor during round 7. Some fans were unhappy with the decision and fights erupted in the stadium. Steele had to be escorted out of the ring after the angry protests. A rematch was held June 28, 1991 and lasted a full 12 rounds. Tyson knocked Ruddock down twice during the bout, and won by unanimous decision. Both fighters were injured; Ruddock had a broken jaw and Tyson suffered a perforated eardrum. Sports Illustrated reported that Ruddock's jaw may have been broken as early as the fourth round.  Tyson was magnanimous after his triumph, praising Ruddock as a great heavyweight: "Man this guy is tough, he'll be champion of the world one day if he stays dedicated and doesn't slip up."

After Tyson

After losing to Tyson for the second time, Ruddock picked up victories over former heavyweight champion Greg Page and got a win over undefeated hope Phil Jackson; both fights again were won by KO. Those victories set up a bout with Lennox Lewis in London on Halloween 1992. The bout was an official WBC Final Eliminator and seen as an elimination bout for the opportunity to face the winner of the upcoming Bowe - Holyfield match. Ruddock was knocked out in the second round.

After more than two years out after the Lewis defeat Ruddock came back in 1994 with a points win over Anthony Wade which led to a fight with Tommy Morrison in 1995. In the first round he put Morrison down, but let the opportunity for an early stoppage slip, and was given a count himself in the second round after grabbing the ropes after being caught by a Morrison uppercut. Again, like the first Tyson fight, Ruddock was controversially stopped on his feet in the 6th round.

Comeback
After the loss to Morrison, Ruddock disappeared for 3 years until he returned once again in 1998. Ruddock was scheduled to challenge Vitali Klitschko for the WBO heavyweight title in April 2000, yet was forced to withdraw at late notice due to injury. After building up a winning streak against journeymen opponents, Ruddock won the Canadian heavyweight title for a second time with a tenth round win over Egerton Marcus in October 2001, then retired with a record of 38 wins (28 KOs), 5 losses and 1 draw.

On March 28, 2015, Ruddock returned to the ring with a fifth round knockout win over Raymond Olubowale and scored a 6 round majority points decision over Eric Barrak two months later, but was defeated by 3 round KO by Dillon Carman on September 11, 2015 in a bid for the Canadian heavyweight title.

Legacy

Ruddock was ranked 70th on The Ring magazine's list of "The 100 Greatest Punchers of All-Time".

Life after boxing
In the late 1990s, Ruddock had filed for bankruptcy as a number of failed investments, including $1 million that he lost when his Fort Lauderdale nightclub "Razor's Palace" went under; had left him cash poor. A contract dispute ruined a close relationship with his brother and former manager, Delroy.

In 2006, Ruddock invented a non-electrical garbage compactor called The Boxer which he hoped would become a success. Ruddock marketed the device he designed one day after becoming increasingly frustrated with the amount of waste his family was collecting, and sold it from his website Razorruddock.com. As of November 2013, the site is no longer online and the product is listed on Amazon as unavailable with no indication for future availability.

Professional boxing record

References

External links

Donovan "Razor" Ruddock – A Comeback Without a Conclusion
TV Commercial for "The Boxer"

1963 births
Living people
21st-century Canadian inventors
Black Canadian boxers
Boxers from Toronto
Boxing people from Ontario
Canadian male boxers
Heavyweight boxers
Jamaican emigrants to Canada
Jamaican male boxers
People from Weston, Toronto
People from Saint Catherine Parish